Calegari is an Italian surname. Notable people with the surname include:

 Santo Calegari (1662–1717), Italian sculptor
 Maria Calegari (born 1957), American ballet dancer
 Maria Cattarina Calegari (1644–after 1675), Italian composer
 Francesco Antonio Calegari (1656–1742), Italian priest and composer
 Antonio Calegari (1757–1828), Italian oratorio composer
 Luigi Antonio Calegari (1780–1849), Italian bel canto opera composer
 Renzo Calegari (1933–2017), Italian comics artist
 Stefania Calegari (born 1967), Italian ice dancer
 Nínive Clements Calegari, United States teacher
 Danny Calegari, mathematician.
 Frank Calegari, mathematician

See also
Callegari

Italian-language surnames